Limnerpeton is an extinct genus of dissorophoidean euskelian temnospondyl within the family Amphibamidae.

Taxonomy
Limnerpeton is currently restricted to the type species L. modestum, which is dubious but represents an amphibamid. The nominal species "Limnerpeton" laticeps was later assigned to the trematopid Mordex but has been placed in a separate trematopid genus Mattauschia following Milner (2018). The nominal species L." macrolepis was synonymized with laticeps by Milner and Sequeira (2003) and Milner (2018). "Limnerpeton" elegans was reassigned to Micromelerpetontidae and renamed Limnogyrinus by Milner (1986). "Limnerpeton" caducus is a junior synonym of Oestocephalus, while "Limnerpeton" obtusatum was synonymized with Microbrachis by Carroll and Gaskill (1978).

See also
 Prehistoric amphibian
 List of prehistoric amphibians

References

Amphibamids
Dissorophids
Prehistoric amphibian genera